Now Hear This  may refer to:

Music
Now Hear This (The Hi-Lo's album), a 1957 album by The Hi-Lo's
Now Hear This (Duke Pearson album), a 1968 album by jazz pianist Duke Pearson
Now Hear This (Hanson album), a 1973 album by British band Hanson
Now Hear This (Hal Galper album), a 1977 album by jazz pianist Hal Galper
Now Hear This (Howe II album), a 1991 album by Howe II
Now Hear This (The Split Squad album), 2014
Now Hear This (KRS-One album), 2015 album
  Now Hear This (PBS Classical Music TV Series) 2020 (presented by PBS Great Performances)-2 seasons

Other uses
NHT Loudspeakers, an American electronics company
Now Hear This (film), a 1963 cartoon film
Now hear this (nautical command)